Dascyllus is a genus of fish in the family Pomacentridae. They are usually commensals with corals.

Species
Currently, 11 recognized species are placed in this genus:
 Dascyllus abudafur (Forsskål, 1775) (Indian Ocean humbug) 
 Dascyllus albisella T. N. Gill, 1862 (Hawaiian dascyllus)
 Dascyllus aruanus (Linnaeus, 1758) (whitetail dascyllus)
 Dascyllus auripinnis J. E. Randall & H. A. Randall, 2001
 Dascyllus carneus J. G. Fischer, 1885 (cloudy dascyllus)
 Dascyllus flavicaudus H. A. Randall & G. R. Allen, 1977 (yellowtail dascyllus)
 Dascyllus marginatus (Rüppell, 1829) (marginate dascyllus)
 Dascyllus melanurus Bleeker, 1854 (blacktail humbug)
 Dascyllus reticulatus (J. Richardon, 1846) (reticulate dascyllus)
 Dascyllus strasburgi Klausewitz, 1960 (Strasburg's dascyllus)
 Dascyllus trimaculatus (Rüppell, 1829) (threespot dascyllus)

Trivia
Deb, a character in the animated film Finding Nemo, is a damselfish of genus Dascyllus.

References

 
Chrominae
Marine fish genera
Taxa named by Georges Cuvier